Stare Siołkowice  ("old Siołkowice") is a village in the administrative district of Gmina Popielów, within Opole County, Opole Voivodeship, in south-western Poland.

Notable people
 Rochus Misch (July 29, 1917 – 5 September 2013), member of 1st SS Panzer Division Leibstandarte SS Adolf Hitler and radio operator at Adolf Hitler's Führerbunker. The last witness of Hitler's downfall.
 Josef Kociok (26 April 1918 – 26 September 1943), Luftwaffe ace pilot.

References

Villages in Opole County